Enio Joao Novoa Heredia (born 8 April 1986 in Lima) is a Peruvian footballer who plays as a midfielder for club Unión Comercio in the Peruvian First Division.

Honours

Club
Sporting Cristal
 Peruvian First Division: 2005
Coronel Bolognesi
Torneo Clausura: 2007
Universitario de Deportes
 Peruvian First Division: 2009

External links

1986 births
Living people
Footballers from Lima
Peruvian footballers
Sporting Cristal footballers
Coronel Bolognesi footballers
Club Universitario de Deportes footballers
FBC Melgar footballers
Sport Huancayo footballers
Unión Comercio footballers
Peruvian Primera División players
Association football midfielders